Richard Kelly or Kelley may refer to:

Politics
Richard Kelly (Minnesota politician) (1908–1939), American politician and businessman
Richard Kelly (Florida politician) (1924–2005), American politician involved in the 1980 Abscam scandal
Richard F. Kelly (1936–2015), American politician

Sports
Richard Kelly (Australian cricketer) (1870–1941), Australian cricketer
Richard Kelly (West Indian cricketer) (born 1984), West Indies cricketer
Richard Kelly (rugby league) (born 1965), English rugby league player
Richard Kelly (rugby union) (born 1987), Welsh rugby union player
Richard Kelly (American football), American football coach
Rich Kelley (born 1953), American basketball player

Other
Richard Kelly (British Army officer) (1815–1897), British general
Richard Kelly (The Tuam Herald), founder of The Tuam Herald newspaper in 1837
Richard Kelly (lighting designer) (1910–1977), architectural lighting designer
Richard Kelly (director) (born 1975), American film director
Richard Kelly, pseudonym of writer Richard Laymon
Richard T. Kelly, a British journalist and writer

See also
Richard Kelley (1904–1984), British Labour Party Member of Parliament
Rick Kelly (born 1983), racing driver
Dick M. Kelly (born 1941), member of the South Dakota Senate